Mixim 11 (stylized as MIXIM★11) is a Japanese manga series written and illustrated by Nobuyuki Anzai. It was serialized in Shogakukan's Weekly Shōnen Sunday from April 2008 to February 2011, with its chapters collected in twelve tankōbon volumes.

Plot
Three high school students, Ichimatsu Matsuri, Takezō Sangubashi and Koume Haruno, all seem to have zero luck when it comes to girls. One day a messenger named Karmina reveals that one of them is actually the prince of the star Polaris. Also, the prince had a spell cast on him at birth making it so that he'll never be loved by women in order to keep him from assimilating into society on Earth. However, there are twelve girls who are named after constellations that are immune to the spell. The three students must then figure out which one of them is the prince so that he can marry one of the twelve girls and take over the throne in order to prevent Polaris' light from going out.

Publication
Mixim 11, written and illustrated by Nobuyuki Anzai, started in Shogakukan's Weekly Shōnen Sunday on April 23, 2008. It was initially titled Mixim 12 (stylized MIXIM♀12), but its title was changed midway through serialization. The series finished on February 2, 2011. Shogakukan collected its chapters in twelve tankōbon volumes, released from October 17, 2008, to April 18, 2011.

The manga has been licensed in France by Glénat, in Italy by GP Publishing and in Spain by Editorial Ivrea.

References

External links

Shogakukan manga
Shōnen manga